Miklós Nagy or Niculae Nagy (born 11 January 1918, date of death unknown) was a Romanian football forward who was a member of the Romania national team at the 1938 FIFA World Cup. However, he never earned a cap for his country. He also played for Crişana Oradea.

References

Romanian footballers
Association football forwards
1938 FIFA World Cup players
Romanian sportspeople of Hungarian descent
1918 births
Year of death missing